Mad TV was an American sketch comedy series, Season 1 originally aired in the United States on the Fox Network between October 1995, and June 1996.

Mad TVs first season premiered in the 1995 television season, on October 14 at 11:00 pm, thirty minutes before the time-slot of its rival, Saturday Night Live.

The original Mad TV repertory cast members were Bryan Callen, David Herman, Orlando Jones, Phil LaMarr, Artie Lange, Mary Scheer, Nicole Sullivan, and Debra Wilson, with Craig Anton as a featured player. The first season's cast was a mixture of seasoned television and film veterans like LaMarr, Herman, and Scheer, and relatively unknown newcomers like Callen, Jones, Lange, Sullivan, and Wilson. The cast was one of the most ethnically diverse sketch comedy casts of the 1990s, with one Native American (and half Irish) man, one Jewish-American man, two African-American men, one black woman, two white men and two white women.

Season one of Mad TV relied heavily on the fan base of MAD Magazine. Each episode featured the use of the MAD logo (which is still used today), Alfred E. Neuman images and puns, the Spy vs. Spy cartoons, and the catchphrase "What...me worry?" The first season also established some of the series' landmark characters like Jaq the UBS Guy (LaMarr), The Vancome Lady (Sullivan), Clorox (Anton), Mrs. Jewel Barone (Scheer) and Momma (Lange) from That's My White Momma. This season also produced several enduring celebrity parodies like Oprah Winfrey (Wilson), Tom Hanks (Herman) in Gump Fiction and Dennis Rodman (Jones) making a public service announcement.

Unlike Saturday Night Live, Mad TV had no celebrity hosts during its first season. However, the show did have special guests including Kato Kaelin, Joe Walsh and Dean Stockwell, Peter Marshall, Michael Buffer, Adam West, Gary Coleman, Jamie Farr, Ken Norton, Jr,  David Faustino, Claudia Schiffer, Kim Coles, Bruce McCulloch, Tony Orlando, and Harland Williams. Musical groups like Poison, Pharcyde and The Rolling Stones (who were the show's first musical guests) also made appearances on the show.

Opening montage
The title sequence begins with several fingers pointing at a bomb. The bomb explodes and several different pictures of Alfred E. Neuman appear on the screen, followed by the Mad TV logo. The theme song, performed by the hip-hop group Heavy D & the Boyz, begins. Cast members are introduced alphabetically with their names appearing in caption over live-action clips of each performer. More pictures of Alfred E. Neuman appear between the introduction of each cast member. When the last cast member is introduced, the music stops and the title sequence ends with the phrase "You are now watching Mad TV."

Cast

Repertory cast members

 Bryan Callen  (19/19 episodes) 
 David Herman  (19/19 episodes)  
 Orlando Jones  (19/19 episodes) 
 Phil LaMarr  (19/19 episodes) 
 Artie Lange  (15/19 episodes) 
 Mary Scheer  (19/19 episodes) 
 Nicole Sullivan  (19/19 episodes) 
 Debra Wilson  (19/19 episodes) 

Featured cast members
 Craig Anton (1/19 episodes)

Writers

Jonathan Aibel (eps. 1, 3, 4, 6)
Fax Bahr (eps. 1-19)
Sean Beam (eps. 1, 8)
Glenn Berger (eps. 1, 3, 4, 6)
Blaine Capatch (eps. 1-19)
Rob Cohen (eps. 1, 3, 8)
Leonard Dick (eps. 2-13)
Brian Frazer (eps. 2-13)
Spencer Green (eps. 1-19)
Dave Hanson (eps. 2-19)
Brian Hartt (eps. 2-9) (writing supervisor, 10-19)
Jordan Hawley (eps. 2-13)
David Herman (ep. 7)
Steve Hibbert (eps. 2-13, 15)
Orlando Jones (eps. 2-15)
Dawna Kaufmann (eps. 15-19)
Arnie Kogen (creative consultant) (eps. 13-19)
Phil LaMarr (ep. 2)
Artie Lange (ep. 2)
Steve Lookner (eps. 1-10)
Patton Oswalt (eps. 1-19)
Mary Scheer (ep. 7)
Michael Short (creative consultant) (eps. 15-19)
Paul Slansky (eps. 1, 6)
Adam Small (eps. 1-19)
Nicole Sullivan (ep. 4)
Skip Warburg (eps. 12, 13)
Mary Elizabeth Williams (eps. 1-19)
Eric Zicklin (eps. 15-19)

Episodes

Home releases

All 19 episodes from season one were released on DVD on September 21, 2004, in a boxed set entitled Mad TV: The Complete First Season. The audio track included on this release was a Dolby Digital 2.0 Surround mix.  Extra features included the 200th episode of Mad TV (from season nine), the best of Mad TV'''s commercial, movie, television, music video and animation parodies, a reel of season one bloopers, nine unaired sketches (including one called "Schindler's Lost," which was banned for censorship reasons and mentioned on the clip show episode "Mad TV Ruined My Life"), and a preview of Mad TV: The Complete Second Season.

Despite promises from FOX of a second season DVD release (and a preview of Mad TVs second season on the season one DVD), the Complete First Season'' DVD remained the only complete season of the show to be released on DVD for almost a decade. In 2012 Shout! Factory picked up the home video rights to Mad TV and released the second season on March 26, 2013. Seasons 3 and 4 were released later in 2013.

On the HBO Max release, episodes 2, 3, and 18 are missing.

References

External links

Nicole Sullivan – Episode Review

01
1995 American television seasons
1996 American television seasons